
Gmina Głowaczów is a rural gmina (administrative district) in Kozienice County, Masovian Voivodeship, in east-central Poland.

Villages
Gmina Głowaczów contains the villages and settlements of Adamów, Bobrowniki, Brzóza, Cecylówka, Cecylówka-Brzózka, Chodków, Dąbrówki, Emilów, Głowaczów, Grabnowola, Helenów, Henryków, Ignacówka, Ignacówka Bobrowska, Jasieniec, Klementynów, Kosny, Leżenice, Lipa, Lipska Wola, Łukawa, Łukawska Wola, Maciejowice, Mariampol, Marianów, Michałów, Miejska Dąbrowa, Moniochy, Podmieście, Przejazd, Rogożek, Sewerynów, Stanisławów, Stawki, Studnie, Studzianki Pancerne, Ursynów, Wólka Brzózka and Zieleniec.

Neighbouring gminas
Gmina Głowaczów is bordered by the gminas of Grabów nad Pilicą, Jastrzębia, Jedlińsk, Kozienice, Magnuszew, Pionki and Stromiec.

References
Polish official population figures 2006

Glowaczow
Kozienice County